Wadley may refer to:

Places

South Africa
Wadley Stadium, an association football stadium

United Kingdom
Wadley, County Durham
Wadley, Oxfordshire, a hamlet in the parish of Littleworth, Vale of White Horse

United States
Wadley, Alabama, a town in Alabama
Wadley, Georgia, a city in Georgia

Other uses
Wadley (surname)
Wadley loop